Nils Jørgensen (19 June 1911 – 15 January 1996) was a Norwegian fencer. He competed in the individual and team foil events at the 1936 Summer Olympics.

References

External links
 

1911 births
1996 deaths
Norwegian male foil fencers
Olympic fencers of Norway
Fencers at the 1936 Summer Olympics
Sportspeople from Oslo
20th-century Norwegian people